Golaya ( - bare) is a small stratovolcano located in the southern part of the Kamchatka Peninsula, Russia.

See also
 List of volcanoes in Russia

References 
 

Mountains of the Kamchatka Peninsula
Volcanoes of the Kamchatka Peninsula
Stratovolcanoes of Russia
Pleistocene stratovolcanoes
Pleistocene Asia